John Poulton is an electrical engineer at NVIDIA Corporation in Durham, North Carolina. He was named a Fellow of the Institute of Electrical and Electronics Engineers (IEEE) in 2012 for his contributions to high-speed, low-power signaling and graphics architecture.

References

Fellow Members of the IEEE
Living people
Nvidia people
Year of birth missing (living people)
Place of birth missing (living people)
American electrical engineers